David John Hailwood (born 17 October 1954) is an English former professional footballer who played in the Football League for Mansfield Town.

References

1954 births
Living people
English footballers
Association football forwards
English Football League players
Mansfield Town F.C. players
Long Eaton United F.C. players
Grantham Town F.C. players
Arnold F.C. players